John Sullivan (born December 22, 1966) is a former professional tennis player from the United States.

Career
Sullivan attended Clemson University in South Carolina in the late 1980s and was a doubles All-American in 1987.

He made one ATP Tour final, the 1993 Athens International, where he and Royce Deppe were doubles runners-up.

At the 1994 Australian Open, Sullivan made it through qualifying and was drawn up against Todd Woodbridge in the opening round. He won the first two sets and took the third into a tiebreak, but lost in five sets. In the men's doubles he and partner Donald Johnson defeated eighth seeds Scott Melville and Gary Muller in the first round, before losing in the second. His only other Grand Slam appearance came at the 1994 French Open, where he and Kenny Thorne were beaten in the first round of the men's doubles.

ATP Tour career finals

Doubles: 1 (0–1)

Challenger titles

Doubles: (2)

References

1966 births
Living people
American male tennis players
Tennis people from New York (state)
Clemson Tigers men's tennis players
People from Rockville Centre, New York